Michael Hill is a British diplomat.  Hill held the post of High Commissioner to Vanuatu until September 2005 when he became the Administrator of Ascension Island, a dependency of the British overseas territory of Saint Helena.  Hill was succeeded as Administrator by Ross Denny in September 2008.  He is married to Elizabeth and has four children: Alastair, Victoria, Richard and Alexander.

References
 Ascension Island Government Web Site

Administrators of Ascension Island
Living people
Year of birth missing (living people)